Center is an unincorporated community in Jay County, Indiana.

Center lies at the geographical center of Greene Township, hence the name.

Geography

References

Unincorporated communities in Jay County, Indiana
Unincorporated communities in Indiana